Cao Xiandong (Chinese:曹限东 born 19 August 1968) is a Chinese football coach and a former international midfielder. In his career, he represented Beijing Guoan where he won two Chinese FA Cups along with Qingdao Etsong Hainiu and Beijing Kuanli. Internationally he played for the Chinese team that took part in the 1996 Asian Cup. Since retiring he  moved into assistant management and then gained his first head coaching position with Beijing BIT

Playing career
Cao Xiandong was considered a talented midfielder and was soon called up to the Chinese under-17 team that took part in the 1985 FIFA U-16 World Championship where China were knocked out in the quarter-finals to West Germany in a 4-2 defeat. He eventually went on to graduate to the senior team of Beijing and once he started to become a regular he was given his debut for his country in a friendly against North Korea on August 31, 1992 in a 0-0 draw. He soon  established himself as a regular for the national team and went to the Football at the 1994 Asian Games where China came runners-up to Uzbekistan in a 4-2 defeat in the final. Cao Xiandong soon  gained his first piece of silverware when Beijing won the 1996 and then 1997 Chinese FA Cup. After this success Cao Xiandong decided to join Qingdao Etsong Hainiu for a brief period before joining second-tier club Beijing Kuanli in 1999 where he soon ended his playing career with them.

Career statistics

International goals
Scores and results list China's goal tally first.

Honours

Player

Club
Beijing Guoan
Chinese FA Cup: 1996, 1997

International
China
Asian Games: 1994 (Silver)

References

External links
 
 
 Player profile at sodasoccer.com
 Team China Stats

1968 births
Living people
Chinese football managers
Chinese footballers
Footballers from Beijing
China international footballers
Beijing Guoan F.C. players
Qingdao Hainiu F.C. (1990) players
Asian Games silver medalists for China
Asian Games medalists in football
Association football midfielders
Footballers at the 1994 Asian Games
Medalists at the 1994 Asian Games